Sabine Völker (born 11 May 1973) is a German former speed skater who won a gold medal in the women's team pursuit at the 2006 Winter Olympics, after winning three individual medals at the 2002 Winter Olympics in Salt Lake City.

References
Sabine Völker at SkateResults.com
Sabine Völker at DESG (Deutsche Eisschnelllauf Gemeinschaft) (in German)
Photos of Sabine Völker

1973 births
German female speed skaters
Speed skaters at the 1998 Winter Olympics
Speed skaters at the 2002 Winter Olympics
Speed skaters at the 2006 Winter Olympics
Olympic speed skaters of Germany
Medalists at the 2002 Winter Olympics
Medalists at the 2006 Winter Olympics
Olympic medalists in speed skating
Olympic gold medalists for Germany
Olympic silver medalists for Germany
Olympic bronze medalists for Germany
World record setters in speed skating
Sportspeople from Erfurt
Living people